Antoine Girouard (April 25, 1836 – June 7, 1904) was a political figure in New Brunswick of Acadian origin. He represented Kent County from 1870 to 1874 in the Legislative Assembly of New Brunswick as a Conservative member.

He was born and educated in Sainte-Marie-de-Kent, New Brunswick. Girouard was a justice of the peace. In 1856, he married Isabella Caisie.

References 
The Canadian parliamentary companion, HJ Morgan (1873)

1836 births
1904 deaths
People from Kent County, New Brunswick
Acadian people
Progressive Conservative Party of New Brunswick MLAs